Narasimha Rao or Narasimharao is an Indian surname. It may refer to:
 P. V. Narasimha Rao (1921–2004), ninth prime minister of India
 Panuganti Lakshminarasimha Rao (1865–1940), Telugu writer
 Vinjamuri Venkata Lakshmi Narasimha Rao (1887–?), Indian stage actor and Telugu-Sanskrit pandit
 Sthanam Narasimha Rao (1902–1971), Indian stage artist
 Sistla Venkata Lakshmi Narasimha Rao (1911–2006), senior advocate and trade union activist
 Kovvali Lakshmi Narasimha Rao (1912–1975), Indian novelist
 M. V. Narasimha Rao (born 1954), Indian cricketer 
 Garikapati Narasimha Rao (born 1958), Telugu writer and avadhani

See also 
 Narasimharao Pet, a neighbourhood of Eluru, Andhra Pradesh
 Narasimha (disambiguation)